Veerapandiyan is a 1987 Indian Tamil-language masala film, directed by Karthik Raghunath and produced by Durai. The film stars Sivaji Ganesan, Vijayakanth, Raadhika and Jaishankar.

Plot
Ranjith (Ranjeet) plots to steal the temple jewels in the town of Manimangalam with the help of the temple's dharmagatha (V. K. Ramasamy) and townsman Nanjappa (Radha Ravi). Their initial attempt is foiled by Manimaaran (Vijayakanth), the son of the periya pannaiyar, Dharmalingam (V. S. Raghavan) and Nanjappa's nephew. The trio are forced to wait until the next year when the temple festival takes place again to attempt to steal the jewels. Pandiyan (Sivaji Ganesan) is the village president and lives in Manimangalam with his sister Meenatchi (Raadhika). He was engaged to marry Gowri (Sumithra) but he called off the wedding when he learned his horoscope dictates his wife would die prematurely. Gowri has refused to marry anyone else and remains a major part of Pandian and Meena's lives. Pandian also has a long-standing feud with Dharmalingam that started when he won the post of village president. Manimaaran and Pandian both inadvertently continually foil the plans of the trio to further their plans to learn more about the temple. The police also become interested and send police officer Shankar (Jaishankar) undercover to the town. He secretly works to protect Pandian and Manimaaran from falling victim to the trio. More problems arise when Meena and Manimaaran fall in love however. Pandian is willing to give his blessings if Dharmalingam will agree to the marriage but the latter refuses. Manimaaran and Meena marry regardless and Nanjappa uses the conflict to his advantage. As the temple festival nears, he kills Dharmalingam and frames Pandian to sow discord between the two in hopes of keeping both distracted. Pandian and Manimaaran must deal with the fallout from Nanjappa's plan and prevent the theft of the temple jewels.

Cast
Sivaji Ganesan as Pandi
Vijayakanth as Manimaaran
Raadhika as Meenatchi
Sumithra as Gowri
Jaishankar as CID Shankar
Radha Ravi as Nanjappa
Ranjeet as Ranjith
V. K. Ramasamy as Dharmagatha
V. S. Raghavan as Dharmalingam (Manimaaran's father)
Ennatha Kannaiya as Kannaiya
Kallapatti Singaram as Kanakupillai
Pandari Bai as Manimaaran's mother
S. N. Lakshmi as Paati
Bindu Ghosh
Anuradha as Sweety

Reception
On 5 May 1987, The Indian Express wrote "Veerapandiyan despite being a potpourri of elements sacred and mandatory to the masala genre is within its rather constructed ambit, a fair sample of all that is good, bad, and mediocre in commercial Tamil cinema."

References

External links
 

1987 films
1980s Tamil-language films
Films scored by Shankar–Ganesh
Indian action films
1980s masala films
1987 action films